Here's That Rainy Day is an album by Paul Horn which was originally released on the RCA Victor label in 1966.

Reception

The Allmusic site awarded the album 2 stars.

Track listing
 "Who Can I Turn To (When Nobody Needs Me)" (Leslie Bricusse, Anthony Newley) – 2:35
 "Here's That Rainy Day" (Jimmy Van Heusen, Johnny Burke) – 2:20
 "How Insensitive (Insensatez)" (Antônio Carlos Jobim, Norman Gimbel) – 2:44
 "The Shadow of Your Smile (Love Theme from The Sandpiper)" (Johnny Mandel, Paul Francis Webster) – 3:15
 "In the Wee Small Hours of the Morning" (David Mann, Bob Hilliard) – 3:54
 "Girl Talk" (Neal Hefti, Bobby Troup) – 3:11
 "Moment to Moment" (Henry Mancini, Johnny Mercer) – 1:51
 "Ecstacy" (William Hood, Paul Horn) – 4:39
 "Laura" (David Raksin, Mercer) – 3:15
 "On a Clear Day (You Can See Forever)" (Burton Lane, Alan Jay Lerner) – 3:21

Personnel
Paul Horn – alto flute, flute, bass flute, clarinet
Lynn Blessing – vibraphone
Mike Lang – piano
Bill Plummer – bass
Bill Goodwin – drums
Unidentified choir arranged and conducted by Ralph Carmichael

References

Paul Horn (musician) albums
1966 albums
Albums produced by Al Schmitt
RCA Victor albums